Breakin' Away is an album by Al Jarreau, released on June 30, 1981, through the Warner Bros. Records label. To quote Allmusic, "Breakin' Away became the standard bearer of the L.A. pop and R&B sound."

The album was certified Platinum by the RIAA.

Chart performance
Breakin' Away remains Al Jarreau's most popular album. It spent two years on the Billboard 200 and peaked at #9. The album also hit #1 on both the Jazz and R&B charts.

Four single releases made the charts: "We're in This Love Together", "Breakin' Away", "Teach Me Tonight", and "Roof Garden", the latter being only released in The Netherlands, Belgium and France.

At the Grammy Awards in 1982 the album was given the prize for Best Pop Vocal Performance, Male, while "(Round, Round, Round) Blue Rondo à la Turk" received the award for Best Jazz Vocal Performance, Male. The album was also nominated for Album of the Year

Charts

Weekly charts

Year-end charts

Track listing
All tracks written by Tom Canning, Jay Graydon and Al Jarreau, except where noted.

Personnel 
 Al Jarreau – lead vocals, backing vocals (1, 3-7, 9), rhythm arrangements (1-7, 9), vocal arrangements (8)
 Jay Graydon – synthesizer programming (1, 2), electric guitar (1-7, 9), rhythm arrangements (1-7, 9), vocal arrangements (8)
 Tom Canning – acoustic piano (1), Fender Rhodes (1, 4, 9), synthesizers (1-4, 8), rhythm arrangements (1-7, 9), vocal arrangements (8)
 David Foster – acoustic piano (2, 5, 6), Fender Rhodes (2, 5, 6), synthesizers (2, 5, 6), string arrangements (5)
 Michael Omartian – synthesizers (3), Fender Rhodes (3)
 Michael Boddicker – synthesizer programming (2, 8), synthesizers (3-6, 8)
 J. Peter Robinson – synthesizers (4)
 Larry Williams – synthesizer solo (4)
 George Duke – Fender Rhodes (7)
 Milcho Leviev – acoustic piano (8), rhythm arrangements (8)
 Steve Lukather – electric guitar (2, 3)
 Dean Parks – electric guitar (9)
 Abraham Laboriel – bass guitar (1-5, 7, 8, 9)
 Neil Stubenhaus – bass guitar (6)
 Steve Gadd – drums (1-5, 7-9)
 Jeff Porcaro – drums (6)
 Bob Zimmitti – percussion (4)
 Billy Byers – string arrangements (9)
 Frank DeCaro – album music contractor and string contractor (5, 9)
 Tom Scott – horns (1)
 Lon Price – alto saxophone (3, 9)
 Bill Reichenbach Jr. – trombone (6, 7)
 Jerry Hey – flugelhorn (2), trumpet (6, 7), horn arrangements (6, 7)
 Chuck Findley – trumpet (6, 7)
 Richard Page – backing vocals (2, 5, 7)
 Steve George – backing vocals (2, 5, 7)
 Bill Champlin – backing vocals (7)

Production 
 Producer, Mixing – Jay Graydon
 Associate Producer – Tom Canning 
 Engineer – Joe Bogan
 Second Engineer – Debbie Thompson
 Basic tracks recorded at Dawnbreaker Studios (San Fernando, CA).
 Basic track recording for "Breakin' Away" by Larry Brown at Pasha Music (Hollywood, CA); Second Engineers – Mikey Davis and Csaba Petocz.
 Strings recorded by Humberto Gatica at Sunset Sound (Hollywood, CA).
 Overdubs and mixing at Garden Rake Studios (Studio City, CA).
 Mastered by Bernie Grundman at A&M Studios (Hollywood, CA).
 Art Direction and Design – Christine Sauers
 Photography – Susan Jarreau

Notes

1981 albums
Al Jarreau albums
Grammy Award for Best Male Pop Vocal Performance
Warner Records albums